Mirza Masroor Ahmad (born 15 September 1950) is the current and fifth leader of the Ahmadiyya Muslim Community. His official title within the movement is Fifth Caliph of the Messiah (khalīfatul masīh al-khāmis). He was elected on 22 April 2003, three days after the death of his predecessor Mirza Tahir Ahmad.

Following the death of the fourth caliph, the Electoral College, for the first time in the history of the community, convened outside the Indian subcontinent and in the city of London, after which Mirza Masroor Ahmad was elected as the fifth caliph of the Ahmadiyya Muslim Community. At the very commencement of his accession, he found himself forced into exile from Pakistan in response to pressure from the Government of Pakistan. Since being elected, he has travelled extensively across the world to meet the members of the community and address their annual gatherings. In many of the countries he has visited it has been the first visit by an Ahmadiyya caliph.

Early life
Mirza Masroor Ahmad was born on 15 September 1950 in Rabwah, Pakistan, the global headquarters of the Ahmadiyya Muslim Community at the time. He is a nephew of Mirza Tahir Ahmad, the fourth caliph, his mother being a sister of the fourth caliph.

Ghana
Having served the Community in various capacities, Masroor Ahmad served in Ghana for over eight years. He established the Ahmadiyya Secondary School in Salaga, a school in the northern region of Ghana, where he served as principal for two years. His success with the school in Salaga made him an obvious choice as principal of the Ahmadiyya Secondary School in Essarkyir, located in the centreal region of Ghana. There he served as principal for four years.

After his tenure as principal, Masroor Ahmad was appointed as the manager of the Ahmadiyya Agricultural Farm in Depali located in the northern region of Ghana where he served for two years. He successfully planted and nurtured wheat for the first time in Ghana. The experiment of planting, growing and nurturing wheat as an economic crop in Ghana was exhibited at an international trade fair and the results were submitted to the Ministry of Agriculture of Ghana.

Imprisonment
In 1999, a resolution was presented in the Provincial Assembly of the Punjab which demanded that the name of Rabwah be changed because that name appeared in the Qur'an. The resolution passed without much debate and the name of Rabwah was officially changed to Chenab Nagar. Signage was placed in prominent parts of Rabwah which bore the new name. A few days later, a First Information Report (criminal complaint) was filed accusing certain members of the Community of erasing a sign which bore the new name. Though the complaint didn't mention any names, a case was registered, resulting in the arrest of Masroor Ahmad and a few other senior members of the Ahmadiyya Community. They were imprisoned for 11 days without bail, but were released without charge on 10 May 1999.

Caliphate
Masroor Ahmad was elected as the fifth caliph on 22 April 2003, a few days after the demise of his predecessor Mirza Tahir Ahmad. 
Today he frequently tours around the world, visiting countries for the Community's Jalsa Salanas (annual gatherings). Masroor Ahmad also regularly leads prayers at the Al-Fazl Mosque in London, England as well as Friday prayers from Baitul Futuh Mosque, in Morden, London.

Under his leadership the community's global satellite TV network MTA International, launched by his predecessor, has expanded into several further affiliated TV channels, social media and radio stations to provide transmission in different languages. Further campuses of Jamia Ahmadiyya, the Ahmadiyya Islamic seminary and educational institution, have been established including one in Ghana and one in the United Kingdom, the latter has been the first in Europe. He has focused particularly on directing the community in systematically countering negative media coverage of Islam and engaging in grassroots efforts to propagate what the community believes is the true message of Islam.

In 2004, he launched – and regularly addresses – the annual National Peace Symposium (held twice in 2015) in which guests from all walks of life come together at the largest mosque in Western Europe (the Baitul Futuh Mosque) to exchange ideas on establishing world peace. These symposia have attracted parliamentarians, religious leaders and other dignitaries. In 2009, he initiated the Ahmadiyya Muslim Peace Prize; an international peace award for individuals or organisations that have demonstrated an extraordinary commitment and service to the cause of peace and humanitarianism.

Masroor Ahmad has frequently met heads of state in different parts of the world as well as having delivered keynote addresses to the United States Congress on Capitol Hill, the European Parliament, the United Kingdom Houses of Parliament, the Parliament of Canada and the Dutch Parliament on the teachings of Islam regarding the establishment of peace, presenting Quranic solutions to world problems. He has consistently called for honesty and the observance of unconditional justice and fairness in international relations.

Khilafat Centenary
On 27 May 2008, members of the Community celebrated the 100 year anniversary of the establishment of Khilafat. Masroor Ahmad spoke at a large gathering of community members in the Excel Center in London, England and took a pledge from Ahmadis worldwide. This was relayed around the world via the Community's television channel, Muslim Television Ahmadiyya International with a live link up to Qadian, India, the birthplace of Mirza Ghulam Ahmad and original global headquarters before the partition of India in 1947.

A Jalsa Salana celebrating the centenary anniversary of the Caliphate was planned in Qadian for December 2008. This gathering was to mark the end of celebrations of the centenary. However, due to the Mumbai terrorist attacks in late November, and the resulting security situation, Masroor Ahmad cancelled his participation in the gathering at Qadian and returned to London.

Response to controversies

2005 Muhammad Cartoons Controversy

In 2005, a Danish newspaper, Jyllands-Posten published some caricatures of Muhammad that infuriated Muslims around the world. Ahmad condemned the publishers of the cartoons saying that this was an abuse of free speech. But at the same time, he condemned the violent reaction showed by some Muslims around the world saying that this goes against the fabric of peaceful teachings of Islam. He guided his community to disseminate the character of Muhammad in Denmark as well as the rest of the world through writings and dialogue. He also advised Ahmadis to send durood on prophet Muhammad in this time of adversity. His sermons on this issue were later published as a book, The Blessed Model of the Holy Prophet Muhammad and the Caricatures.

Pope Benedict XVI Islam controversy

On 12 September 2006, while Pope Benedict XVI was lecturing at the University of Regensburg, he quoted the opinion of Byzantine Emperor Manuel II Palaiologos, "Show me just what Muhammad brought that was new and there you will find things only evil and inhuman, such as his command to spread by the sword the faith he preached". The quotation drew criticism from a number of individual governmental representatives and Muslim religious leaders including Mirza Masroor Ahmad, Khalifatul Masih V.

As the leader of the Ahmadiyya Muslim Community, Masroor Ahmad disapproved of the Pope's view on Islam, stating that the Pope had been irresponsible and lacked knowledge of Islam. He explicated the 'inherent peaceful teachings of Islam' and the Qur'an and sought to remove misconceptions regarding Jihad and the Islamic prophet Muhammad, in light of references made by European writers in his Friday Sermon on 15 September 2006.

2010 Quran-burning controversy

The plan to burn the Qur'an by the Dove World Outreach Center on the 9th anniversary of 9/11 attacks was highly condemned by Masroor Ahmad at the Baitul Futuh mosque in London, England. He stated that "religious extremism, be it Christian extremism, Muslim extremism or any other kind, is never a true reflection of the religion".

2010 Ground Zero mosque controversy

In 2010, plans were being made to build a 13-story Muslim community center located two blocks from the World Trade Center site in Lower Manhattan, New York City. Although the Park51 building would not be visible from the World Trade Center site, opponents of the project have said that establishing a mosque so close to Ground Zero would be offensive since the hijackers in the 11 September 2001 attacks were Islamic terrorists.

Masroor Ahmad commented on the plan to build a mosque near Ground Zero where he stated:

Geert Wilders controversy
Geert Wilders is a Dutch politician. Wilders is best known for his criticism of Islam, summing up his views by saying, "I don't hate Muslims, I hate Islam". Masroor Ahmad has, in his sermons, repeatedly refuted the allegations raised by Wilders against Islam. Addressing Wilders directly, he said:

In reply to the statement, Wilders asked Piet Hein Donner, Interior Minister of the Netherlands whether the government considered this a threat and whether they would take any action against Ahmad. Donner replied that he saw no threat as Ahmad threatened the destruction of Wilders through peaceful prayer only and not violence, and that the Ahmadiyya Muslim Community worldwide are known to be peaceful.

Condemning of Grand Mufti of Saudi Arabia's Anti-Church Edict
On 8 April 2012, Mirza Masroor Ahmad condemned the fatwa (edict) of Abdul Aziz al-Shaikh, Grand Mufti of Saudi Arabia calling for the destruction of all churches in Saudi Arabia and surrounding Arab states.

Innocence of Muslims
In his Friday Sermons of 21 and 28 September 2012, the Caliph strongly condemned the anti-Islamic film Innocence of Muslims. He said that Muslim emotions against the film were justified to an extent; however he also condemned the reaction to the film by some Muslims with riots resulting in at least 75 deaths worldwide. The Friday Sermons were attended by many media outlets including the BBC and a news station from New Zealand. He said Muslims should react by invoking durood (praise) upon Muhammad. He also indicated that the creators and benefactors of the film would all suffer a great torment by God.

Charlie Hebdo attack 

On 7 January 2015, gunmen forced their way into the offices of the satirical French newspaper Charlie Hebdo in Paris. They shot and killed 12 people during the attack. The attack was linked to cartoons mocking the Islamic prophet Muhammad that Charlie Hebdo had published in recent years. The Caliph categorically condemned the terrorist attacks. He said that the attacks had nothing to do with the true teachings of Islam and that the perpetrators and anyone found to be involved should be punished in accordance with the law. He further added that such cartoons grieved and pained peace-loving Muslims throughout the world and were to be condemned, but any form of violent or illegal response could never be justified and was completely against the teachings of Islam. The caliph also stated that taking to the streets in protest was not an appropriate response but rather Muslims should respond by increasing in prayer and offering salutations to Muhammad.

Response to persecution

Lahore massacre

On 28 May 2010, two Ahmadi mosques in Lahore, Pakistan, came under attack from the Tehrik-i-Taliban Pakistan Punjab wing. The attacks were carried out nearly simultaneously at Darul Al Zikr Mosque in Garhi Shahu and Bait Al Noor Mosque in Model Town, both 15 km apart. Ninety-four people were killed in the incident (including one attacker) with 108 injured. Another attacker was captured by the worshippers.

The Caliph issued two press releases urging members of the Community to exercise patience and prayers and that in response, 'no inappropriate action would be shown by any Ahmadi'.

Lectures, sermons and articles
 True Love for the Holy Prophet
 The Blessed Model of the Holy Prophet Muhammad and the Caricatures
 World Crisis and the Pathway to Peace
 Conditions of Bai'at and Responsibilities of an Ahmadi
 A Response to the Pope's Remarks about Islam
 Islam – A Peaceful Religion
 Exemplary Compassion of Prophet Muhammad
 Speeches and Articles in the Review of Religions
 Social Media
 The Great Western Revival

References

External links
 
 
 Official Khalifa of Islam website

Pakistani Ahmadis
Living people
1950 births
Ahmadiyyah caliphs
Family of Mirza Ghulam Ahmad
Masroor Ahmad
Hashemite people
Punjabi people
University of Agriculture, Faisalabad alumni
Pakistani emigrants to the United Kingdom
Naturalised citizens of the United Kingdom
Pakistani expatriates in Ghana
People from Rabwah
21st-century caliphs
21st-century Islamic religious leaders
British Ahmadis
Pakistani people of Arab descent